Ariogala is a town in central Lithuania. It is located on the Dubysa River, which flows through the town.

Population

Name
Ariogala is the Lithuanian name of the town. Versions of the name in other languages include Samogitian: Ariuogala, Polish: Ejragoła, Russian: Эйрагола Eiragola, Belarusian: Эйрагола Eirahola, Yiddish: אייראַגאָלע Eyragole.

History

Ariogala is one of the oldest settlements in Lithuania, known from 1252 or 1253 (when the land of Eregalle is mentioned), multiple times devastated by the Teutonic Knights. Ariogala is mentioned in Mindaugas' papers, in which he dedicated one half of the lands of Ariogala to the newly established Lithuanian diocese, which later in 1257 were handed over to the Bishop Christian of Livonia. In the 14th century there stood a wooden castle of Ariogala, which was burned down by the crusaders in 1382. During the times of Vytautas there stood Ariogala Manor. After the Battle of Grunwald better growth opportunities opened for Ariogala, so around 1416 first Christian church was built in Ariogala. In 16th century it was believed that Ariogala was a birthplace of Vytenis. From 1529 or 1592 Ariogala received a town status, and in the 17th century Ariogala's market and trading privileges are mentioned, Ariogala County established. On 12 April 1792, by king Stanislaw August's decree Ariogala was given the status of a free city based on Magdeburg Law, and Coat of arms (City Emblem) for Ariogala was assigned; although in the summer of the same year due to changes in the political situation self-governing autonomy weakened, and in 1795 Ariogala's city rights were suspended by Imperial Russian government.

In 1842 Ariogala's public primary school was established, and in 1852 the Christian parish school was established that operated up until 1863. In 1847 Ariogala's Evangelical Lutheran Church was built, it was demolished in 1944. In 1880 post office was set up in Ariogala, that was burned down during the World War I. At the beginning of 20th century Ariogala's Hospital was established. In 1907 separate schools for boys and girls were established in Ariogala.

During the World War II Ariogala, as the entire Lithuania, was occupied by Nazi Germany. In 1941 all the Jews from Ariogala and some nearby villages were gathered in a ghetto. At the end of August/beginning of September 1941, around 700 Jewish men, women and children were shot in a field near the village.

On 3 August 1944, the town of Ariogala was burned down and occupied by the Soviet Union army. After the war up until 1948 the United Kestutis partisan congregation – Vaidotas team of Anti-Soviet resistance was active in Ariogala area, the newspaper "Freedom Bell" was published. On 28 December 1956 city rights were reinstated. During the Soviet times a few industries were established in Ariogala: reinforced concrete factory, "" sewing factory subsidiary, and office of the Raseiniai irrigation construction factory.

References

Notes

  Gyventojų skaičius metų pradžioje (Population statistics). Lithuanian Department of Statistics.
 Geographical data. administrative territorial division. Lithuanian Department of Statistics.

 
Cities in Kaunas County
Cities in Lithuania
Duchy of Samogitia
Kovensky Uyezd
Articles which contain graphical timelines
Holocaust locations in Lithuania